Grace:For The Moment, by Max Lucado, is an inspirational book that holds verses from the Bible as well as inspiring lines for everyday use. It is meant to inspire the reader and also give the person a belief or a reference for their faith. The book was published in 2000 by J. Countryman, a division of Thomas Nelson.

2000 non-fiction books
Books about Christianity
Thomas Nelson (publisher) books